The Jefferson Hotel in Shreveport, Louisiana is a four-story brick railway hotel that was built in 1922. It was listed on the National Register of Historic Places in 1989.

It was designed by architect H.E. Schwartz and served the travellers of Union Depot Station, which was located across the street, until its demolition in 1972. Alterations, particularly to the exterior, have been minimal since its construction.

See also
National Register of Historic Places listings in Caddo Parish, Louisiana

References

Hotel buildings on the National Register of Historic Places in Louisiana
Buildings and structures in Shreveport, Louisiana
National Register of Historic Places in Caddo Parish, Louisiana